William Alexander Deitrick (April 30, 1902 – May 6, 1946) was a Major League Baseball left fielder and shortstop. He played for the Philadelphia Phillies from 1927 to 1928, playing in 57 career games.

External links

1902 births
1946 deaths
Major League Baseball shortstops
Major League Baseball left fielders
Philadelphia Phillies players
Burials at Arlington National Cemetery
People from Hanover County, Virginia
Baseball players from Virginia